The Hit is a 1984 British road crime film directed by Stephen Frears, and starring John Hurt, Terence Stamp, Laura del Sol and Tim Roth in his film debut. It was Stamp's first starring role in over a decade, and Roth won an Evening Standard Award for Most Promising Newcomer. The title music is provided by Eric Clapton and Roger Waters. Spanish flamenco guitarist Paco de Lucia performed the soundtrack music. The film was released by The Criterion Collection on DVD in April 2009 and on Blu-ray in October 2020.

Plot
London gangster Willie Parker gives evidence against his criminal compatriots in return for a very generous offer from the police.

Ten years later, Parker lives in a comfortable retirement in Spain. Four Spanish youths kidnap him and deliver him to British hit man Braddock and his sidekick Myron, hired by the kingpin that Parker helped put away. In the course of the kidnapping the youths run down a Spanish policeman who has been assigned to guard Parker. Three of the youths are killed by a bomb in a briefcase, which they believe to contain their pay-off, handed to them by Braddock.

Braddock is a world-weary professional killer while Myron is his perky but volatile young apprentice. Parker quickly adopts a carefree demeanour, later explaining that he's had ten years to accept death as a simple part of life.

Braddock, who has the key to an apartment in Madrid where the owner is away, orders Myron to drive there but when the three walk in they find the place occupied by an acquaintance of the owner. He is Harry, a middle-aged Australian with a young apparently non-English speaking Spanish girlfriend Maggie, who comes home as they are talking. Parker mischievously announces his identity to them, causing Braddock to take the girl with them as insurance. Harry gives them the keys to the owner's white Mercedes which is brought to the underground garage where the group leave their previous car. As they are about to start Parker makes a comment that causes Braddock to doubt that Harry will keep quiet and he goes back up to the flat and kills him.

The group head toward the French border intending to reach Paris, where the kingpin against whom Parker testified is apparently awaiting their arrival. All the while, Parker sows seeds of discord between the two hit men. The Spanish police, led by senior inspector, follow quite closely the trail of bodies.

Stopping at a roadside bar to buy beers, Myron is laughed at by four youths, so he attacks them and then runs for the car. Myron has developed sympathy for Maggie and feels protective of her. Braddock himself has a confrontation with her when they are alone in which she reveals she understands English and also bites his hand, drawing blood, from which he appears to derive some form of masochistic or self-penitential gratification.

Braddock drives up a track leading to a wood by a river where they can rest up. Leaving Myron with Parker he takes Maggie with him to get petrol for the car. Maggie tries to alert the station attendant to her plight, allowing in Braddock to kill the young man. Braddock chases after the girl but is unable or unwilling to shoot her. They return to find Myron has fallen asleep and allowed Parker to slip away. Braddock finds him gazing at a waterfall and confronts him about his lack of concern over his impending death. Parker reminds Braddock that death is inevitable for all and quotes John Donne's poem "Death Be Not Proud".

The next day, with ten miles to the border, Braddock stops the car at an isolated hillside and announces that he has scrapped the plans to go to Paris. He relieves Myron of his gun and flings it into the scrub. Suddenly afraid, Parker insists that he cannot die until he gets to Paris. Braddock shoots him in the back as he flees. He then turns the pistol on Myron and kills him. Maggie surprises him and they wrestle violently. During the struggle, Braddock fires the last shot into the air and knocks Maggie unconscious. He leaves her alive and drives to a secluded spot where he changes into hiking clothes and walks off through the forest.

The police find Maggie and the two bodies. As Braddock attempts to cross the border on foot, Maggie identifies him to the police, who shoot him dead as he tries to escape. The police attempt to question the dying Braddock, but he only winks at Maggie.

Cast
Terence Stamp as Willie Parker
John Hurt as Mitchell Braddock
Tim Roth as Myron
Laura del Sol as Maggie
Bill Hunter as Harry
Fernando Rey as Senior Policeman
Lennie Peters as Mr Corrigan
Willoughby Gray as Judge
Jim Broadbent as Barrister

Reception
At review aggregator Rotten Tomatoes, the film is certified "fresh" with an overall approval rating of 89% from 18 reviews, with an average rating of 8.1/10. On Metacritic, The Hit has a rank of 75 out of a 100 based on nine critics, indicating "generally favorable reviews". 

Wes Anderson ranked it the fifth best British film. Vincent Canby of The New York Times wrote about the actors: "These guys don't have to use guns. All they have to do is open their mouths and bore each other to death".

References

External links

Chef du Cinema: The Hit an essay by Ron Deutsch at the Criterion Collection

1980s crime drama films
1984 independent films
1980s psychological thriller films
British crime drama films
British psychological thriller films
1980s English-language films
1980s Spanish-language films
Films directed by Stephen Frears
Films set in Spain
Films shot in London
Films shot in Madrid
Films shot in Spain
British independent films
Films produced by Jeremy Thomas
Films scored by Eric Clapton
1984 multilingual films
British multilingual films
1980s British films